St. Joseph's Grammar School is a voluntary grammar school for students in Donaghmore, County Tyrone, Northern Ireland. The teaching age range is 11–18. The school provides the option of sixth form after pupils finish year 12.

History
The school was established in 1922 by the Daughters of the Cross.

Academics
The school teaches a range of subjects, such as ICT, Art and design, Music and Irish language.  It has an Irish medium stream (Sruth Na Gaeilge) in which 50% of the curriculum is taught through the Irish language. 170 pupils are enrolled in this stream.

In 2017/18, 99% of its students who entered achieved five or more GCSEs at grades A* to C, including the core subjects English and Maths. It was ranked 15th out of 188 schools in terms of its GCSE performance. Also in 2017/18, 86.1% of its entrants to the A-level exam achieved A*-C grades. It was ranked 21 out of 159 schools.

See also 
 List of Schools in Northern Ireland
List of grammar schools in Northern Ireland
List of secondary schools in Northern Ireland

References 

Grammar schools in County Tyrone
Catholic secondary schools in Northern Ireland